EP is the first release by Crystal Antlers. It was self-released on 9 February 2008 and has subsequently been re-released on Touch and Go Records. It was produced by The Mars Volta keyboardist Isaiah "Ikey" Owens.

Track listing
"Until the Sun Dies (Part 2)" – 3:48
"Vexation" – 2:20
"A Thousand Eyes" – 5:21
"Owl" – 3:15
"Arcturus" – 2:29
"Parting Song for the Torn Sky" – 7:02

References

External links
Band's Myspace
Touch and Go Records Page

2008 debut EPs
Touch and Go Records EPs
Crystal Antlers albums